Patrick G. Hailley (born May 19, 1940) is a Canadian former curler. He played lead on the 1972 Brier Champion team (skipped by Orest Meleschuk), representing Manitoba. They later went on to win the World Championships in Garmisch-Partenkirchen of that year.

References

External links
 
 Patrick Hailley – Curling Canada Stats Archive
 Canadian curler who hacked a dart in '72 says he quit after seeing himself on TV | CBC Radio
 
 
 Video: 
 
 

Brier champions
1940 births
Living people
Curlers from Manitoba
World curling champions
Canadian male curlers